James Archer (1550–1620) was an Irish Roman Catholic priest of the Society of Jesus who played a controversial role in the Nine Years War during the House of Tudor religious persecution of the Catholic Church in Ireland and the Elizabethan wars against the Irish clans. During the final decade of the reign of Queen Elizabeth I, Fr. Archer he became a leading hate figure in English government propaganda, but his lasting achievement was in the establishment of Irish seminaries in Catholic Europe as part of the counter reformation.

Early life
Archer came from an Anglo-Norman family in County Kilkenny. He may have attended the local grammar school Kilkenny College which had been established in 1555 under Peter White, a fellow of the University of Oxford. David Wolfe, papal nuncio to Ireland, had been evangelizing in south Leinster in this period, although there is no evidence that he came in contact with Archer. Archer entered the seminary college of Louvain around the year 1564, when Nicholas Sanders was in charge. In his maturity, he was described as tall, of dark complexion, with a long, thin face.

Irish mission
Fr. Archer took a degree of Master of Arts and returned to Ireland in March 1577. Later the same year his presence about Waterford and Clonmel was reported to the queen's secretary, Francis Walsingham, by the President of Munster, William Drury. In the report, Archer was described as a "principal prelate" and "a detestable enemy to the Word of God". Drury also claimed that en route to Ireland Fr. Archer had "taught all the way betwixt Rye and Bristol [in England] against our religion and caused a number to despair".

In 1579, the rebel James Fitzmaurice Fitzgerald landed a papal invasion force at Smerwick in modern-day County Kerry in the company of Fr. Nicolas Sanders.  Fitzmaurice proceeded to Holy Cross in County Tipperary via Kilmallock, and it is possible that Archer, who was in the vicinity, was attached to his forces.  Fitzmaurice was killed in action during this journey.

At about this time Archer is said to have attended on the rebel Conor O'Rourke on the evening of the latter's execution for treason. One source asserts that he was imprisoned at Westminster sometime after, but there is no substantial evidence for this.

Jesuit
Archer was received as a novice into the Society of Jesus at Rome in 1581. He then spent two and a half years at the Roman College, studying logic, physics, and moral and controversial theology. In a report to the Jesuit General in 1584, he was described as physically strong, although choleric and melancholy in temperament; he had not distinguished himself in his studies, and was reckoned, "suitable to hear confessions".

In 1585 Archer was sent to the University of Pont-à-Mousson, where a joint Scots-Irish major seminary had lately been established. He studied scholastic theology for two years while ministering to the students and hearing confessions. In an unenthusiastic report delivered in 1587 - describing him as "bilious" - it was suggested that he was suited to become a preacher in his native country.

Low Countries
In 1587 Archer was sent to the Low Countries to serve as chaplain to the Spanish forces under the Duke of Parma during the Anglo-Spanish war (1585–1604).William Stanley, commander of a regiment of Irish soldiers under English crown authority, had just surrendered the Belgian city of Deventer to Parma and committed himself and his men to the service of the Spanish king. Archer spent his time hearing confessions from the Irish soldiers and busying himself with administrative duties. Expectations ran high among the forces for an invasion of England, but were defeated in the following year when the Spanish Armada was driven from the Dutch coast.

As Spain gradually regained its strategic initiative over England, Archer was reported to be following Stanley's regiment throughout 1590. In September of the following year, he was at Brussels, recovering from an illness. His superiors still considered him of middling ability, and the impression of melancholy and irascibility persisted. A request was then received from the Archbishop of Armagh, Edmund MacGauran, for his participation in a Jesuit mission to Ireland.

Salamanca
Fr. Archer remained in the Low Countries throughout 1591, then spent three months at Calais before he sailed to Spain, where he became the first rector of the Irish College at Salamanca after a visit to Philip II's court at Madrid. In the following years, he visited court regularly in an effort to secure scarce funding for the institution. By this time his superiors had altered their opinion of him to such a degree that he was considered ripe for promotion.

Plots and allegations
In 1594 Archer became involved in controversy, when it was alleged that he had plotted two years previously with other Jesuits and Stanley to assassinate Queen Elizabeth I. The chosen assassin had been Hugh Cahill, a Tipperary man, who confessed that he was paid to hang about the court at London, on the off chance that the queen might present herself as a target, and then stab her. The confession had been obtained under torture by Richard Topcliffe, and further information came from an agent of Robert Cecil, secretary to the queen. At this time, Archer was also implicated in a plot to torch the French and English ships at Dieppe.

The merits of the allegations are impossible to judge, although it seems clear that Archer was acquainted with Cahill. The assassination plot was just one of many against the queen that received credence during the final decade of her reign. One sceptic has pointed out that the evidence only emerged once Father Robert Persons had published his A Conference about the Next Succession to the Crown of England. The book does appear to have alarmed Elizabeth's advisers, and from that date onward the flow of supposed plots against the queen's life became steady. In 1601 Cecil himself was accused of treason at the trial of the Earl of Essex on the basis of his reading of Person's book, but survived this twist and went on to secure the succession of James I upon the queen's death two years later.

Ireland
In 1596 Archer returned to Ireland, landing in the southeast (at either Waterford or Wexford), with a view to re-establishing the Jesuit mission there and to raise funds for the college at Salamanca. The brief visit became an enforced stay of four years, and it was soon decided at Rome to make him superior of the new mission. His presence came to the attention of the Lord Deputy of Ireland, Sir William Russell, and the government regarded him with such suspicion that a reward was offered for his capture.

By August 1598 it seems Archer had fled north to Ulster, where he joined the rebels as the Nine Years war entered its most active phase. It is probable that, following the English defeat at the battle of the Yellow Ford later in that year, he decided to commit himself to the cause of Hugh O'Neill. With this newfound authority, he returned south to more familiar territory.

During the rest of the war reports of Archer's exploits were legion, so that an aura of mystery and almost awe was attached to his name, and government officers referred to him as the "arch traitor" and the "arch devil". However exaggerated the reports, it is certain that he was present at the taking of the Earl of Ormond in 1599, when the rebel O'Mores lured the most powerful nobleman in the country to a parley in a remote part of Carlow and seized him by treachery. The earl spent a substantial period in custody, with Archer attending on him regularly, at a time when the English presence in Ireland was in jeopardy.

Ormond's seizure - which followed the departure from Ireland of Robert Devereux, 2nd Earl of Essex after a disappointing campaign (see Essex in Ireland) - was put down by the Lord President of Munster, Sir George Carew, to Archer's influence. Upon Ormond's release some months later - unharmed - the earl described Archer as an "odious traitor". It may be that Ormond himself was complicit in the act, with some suggestion that he was indulging in a long game to ensure his power against the hazard of an outright defeat of the English and the removal of their influence from Ireland. One source later claimed that Ormond had converted to the Catholic faith during his captivity, and Archer is reported to have declared that the earl would be made king of Ireland upon Spanish intervention. This episode still defies satisfactory explanation.

Spanish intervention
In October 1599 Archer left Ireland for Rome, where he effectively acted as O'Neill's envoy. Pope Clement VIII delayed the appointment of a nuncio to Ireland, but at Madrid plans for an Irish expedition were given renewed attention upon the agreement of peace between Spain and France. In early 1601 Philip III of Spain opted to send an armada with a force of 6000 soldiers, and the Dublin government began preparations to meet the Spanish effort.

During the spring and summer of 1601, Carew and Cecil received reports of the activities of Archer, who had just arrived in Spain. Despite the appointment of a Jesuit nuncio - a neutral who was averse to a militant mission in Ireland - Archer managed to defer service in the seminary at Salamanca and involved himself in the Irish expedition instead. He proposed a landing in Munster - in the south - while the commander of the expedition, Juan del Águila, insisted on the north. In consultation, O'Neill and the northern rebels recommended a compromise: a landing on the coast between the southwestern port of Limerick and Lough Foyle in the extreme north. In September Archer set sail with the armada, which bore over 4500 soldiers and was bound for the port of Cork, or its alternative at Kinsale - both destinations lay at the extreme south of the island.

Battle of Kinsale
On arriving in Munster in September 1601, del Aguila discovered that the province lay docile under Carew's command, following the imprisonment of Florence MacCarthy and the capture of the Sugan Earl of Desmond. Archer vouched for a local chieftain, O'Sullivan Beare, who offered to block the march from Dublin of the crown's principal army, but del Aguila declined. The Spanish occupied the walled town of Kinsale, which was soon surrounded by Mountjoy in a siege that was to last three months. The rebel armies of O'Neill and Red Hugh O'Donnell marched the length of the country in bitter winter conditions, but were broken by the English cavalry and driven from the field in December at the battle of Kinsale. Del Aguila then surrendered on terms and departed with his forces for Spain.

Archer immediately engaged in recrimination. He accused the Spanish commander of cowardice and vacillation, of refusing to heed local advice and failing to sally out and join with his Irish allies at the critical point. Anticipating further Spanish aid, Archer left Kinsale and fell in with O'Sullivan Beare, who was holding out further down the coast. Consideration was being given at the court of Philip III to a further expedition, and Archer sailed for Spain on 6 July 1602 (just before the Siege of Dunboy) to report on the state of Ireland.

At court, Archer railed against del Aguila. For his part, the commander argued against further aid to the Irish and presented the king with a forged letter - supplied to him by Carew - purporting to be from Archer, in which the priest was supposed to have sought his pardon from Queen Elizabeth. The arguments dragged on, but by March 1603 Archer appears to have been vindicated while del Aguila was restrained in his lodgings.

Archer's hopes of aid continued, but after the queen's death in March 1603 O'Neill accepted terms of surrender from Mountjoy. Upon the accession of James I of England to the English throne in May a new dispensation was in place, and in the following year, a peace was concluded with the Spanish. Del Aguila was eventually exonerated, and in Ireland Carew ordered all Jesuits and seminary priests to depart the kingdom. Archer sought a return to Ireland, and for years afterwards his imminent arrival was touted in English government propaganda. But the remainder of his life was spent in Spain.

The Irish College
Fr. Archer was appointed prefect of mission by the Jesuit father-general, Fr. Claudio Acquaviva, with the task of coordinating the work of the Irish colleges in Iberia. At Salamanca, a dispute had arisen over allegations that the Jesuits were discriminating against Gaels in favour of Old English students from those parts of Ireland more loyal to the English crown. A Spanish rector was appointed after a royal inquiry, but Fr. Archer intervened, seeking greater safeguards for students from the Gaeltachtaí, and was granted his wish by the king. In 1610 the Salamanca institution became a Royal College.

Archer spent much time at court, and his approach to his responsibilities is summed up in the following quote, concerning the opportunity afforded through the running of the seminaries: "if we do not take advantage of it we shall do nothing heroic or outstanding".

Decline and death
Archer began to suffer ill health in 1608, and little is known of him until 1613, when he stayed two months at Bordeaux on seminary business. He appears to have commanded respect for his devoted religious observance.

In 1615 Archer again sought to return to Ireland, but his request was denied by the new Jesuit father—general, Mutius Vitelleschi. He spent the last years of his life at Santiago de Compostella as the spiritual father to the seminarians. On 15 February 1620, he died at the Irish college there.

Legacy
Archer became notorious for his contributions to the rebel cause during the Nine Years' War. However, his greater work was arguably in the establishment of the continental seminaries for Irish students, which went from strength to strength in the succeeding centuries and contributed greatly to the Counter-Reformation.

References

Sources
The original version of this article relies on Thomas Morrissey S.J., James Archer of Kilkenny: an Elizabethan Jesuit (Dublin, 1979) 

McCoog, Thomas M. SJ  The Society of Jesus in Ireland, Scotland and England 1598-1606 Leiden 2017

Counter-Reformation
16th-century Irish Jesuits
1550 births
1620 deaths
17th-century Irish Jesuits
People from County Kilkenny
People of Elizabethan Ireland